Environmental informatics is the science of information applied to environmental science. As such, it provides the information processing and communication infrastructure to the interdisciplinary field of environmental sciences aiming at data, information and knowledge integration, the application of computational intelligence to environmental data as well as the identification of environmental impacts of information technology. The UK Natural Environment Research Council defines environmental informatics as the "research and system development focusing on the environmental sciences relating to the creation, collection, storage, processing, modelling, interpretation, display and dissemination of data and information." Kostas Karatzas defined environmental informatics as the "creation of a new 'knowledge-paradigm' towards serving environmental management needs." Karatzas argued further that environmental informatics "is an integrator of science, methods and techniques and not just the result of using information and software technology methods and tools for serving environmental engineering needs."

Environmental informatics emerged in early 1990 in Central Europe.

Current initiatives to effectively manage, share, and reuse environmental and ecological data are indicative of the increasing importance of fields like environmental informatics and ecoinformatics to develop the foundations for effectively managing ecological information. Examples of these initiatives are  National Science Foundation Datanet projects, DataONE and Data Conservancy.

Conferences
EnviroInfo 2013, 2012
Environmental Information Management 2011, 2008
International Conference on Adaptive and Natural Computing Algorithms ICANNGA
International Conference on ICT for Sustainability (ICT4S) 2014, 2013
International Conference on Information Technologies in Environmental Engineering 2013
International Congress on Environmental Modelling and Software (iEMSs) 2014, 2012, 2010
International Congress on Modelling and Simulation (MODSIM) 2013
International Symposium on Environmental Software Systems (ISESS) 2013, 2011

Journals
ACM Transactions on Sensor Networks
Computers and Electronics in Agriculture
Earth Science Informatics
Earth System Science Data
Environmental Earth Sciences
Environmental Modelling and Software
Environmental Monitoring and Assessment
IEEE Journal of Selected Topics in Applied Earth Observations and Remote Sensing
International Journal of Agricultural and Environmental Information Systems
International Journal of Digital Earth
International Journal of Distributed Sensor Networks
International Journal of Sensor Networks
Journal of Environmental Informatics
Journal of Environmental Informatics Letters

Institutions
Aalto University: Environmental Infomatics
Aristotle University of Thessaloniki: Informatics Applications and Systems Group, Dept. of Mechanical Engineering: Teaching and Research on Environmental Informatics and Quality of Life Information Services
CSIRO: Environmental Informatics Research Group
Institute for Environmental Analytics: Applied environmental informatics, based at the University of Reading, UK
Griffith University: Environmental Informatics, a research institute
Lancaster Environment Center: Centre for environmental informatics
Lincoln University: GIS and Environmental Informatics 
Masaryk University: Division of environmental informatics and modeling
Northern Arizona University: PhD in Environmental Informatics
NUI Galway: Environmental informatics
RISSAC: Department of environmental informatics, research institute for soil science and agricultural chemistry, Hungarian academy of sciences
Stanford University: Sustainable development & environmental informatics
Tokyo Institute of Technology: Department of Mechanical and Environmental Informatics
TU Graz: Research focus area in environmental informatics
University of California, Irvine: Bren school environmental informatics research
University of Dayton: Center of excellence for strategic energy and environmental informatics
University of Eastern Finland: Division of environmental informatics within the department of environmental science at Kuopio Campus
University of Hamburg: Research in environmental informatics
University of Las Vegas, Nevada: Environmental informatics undergraduate program
University of Marburg: Physical Geography: Environmental Informatics
University of Michigan: Environmental informatics GIS and modeling graduate program
University of South Australia: Environmentla Informatics postgraduate course
University of Oldenburg: Division of environmental informatics
University of Sunderland: Centre for environmental informatics
University of Applied Sciences (HTW) Berlin: Research and undergraduate program
: Professional Science Graduate Program: Environmental Informatics
Vienna University of Technology: Doctoral College: Environmental Informatics
Virginia Polytechnic Institute: Undergraduate Program: Environmental Informatics

Collaborations
DataONE: Data Observation Network for Earth
Data Conservancy: Leading the movement to build data management tools and services across institutions and disciplines

References 

Environmental science
Information science
Information technology
Computational fields of study